The STORM (backronym: Special Tactical Operation and Rescue Team of Malaysia) is a specialised firefighter unit within the Fire and Rescue Department of Malaysia. They are one of the special rescue team of the department and also a component of the Rapid Deployment Forces.

STORM, along with MUST, FRDM Smokejumper and PASKUB, is regarded as the most elite rescue units in the Fire and Rescue Department of Malaysia (FRDM). STORM firefighters are often chosen to represent Malaysia in international rescue competitions.

History

Created as a special operations for West Malaysia 
STORM was formed in March 2011. Their initial tasks were urban search and rescue (USAR) for the western Malaysian region, as well as helping the federal government's Heavy USAR task force, the SMART team. STORM's membership was originally limited to veteran firefighters from other FRDM Special Rescue Team, such as the Water Rescue Unit, Emergency Medical Rescue Services Team, HAZMAT Team, and MUST.

Restructured to rapid deployment roles 
Following the disappearance of Malaysia Airlines Flight 370 in March 2014, the FRDM restructured the existing STORM unit to include crashed aircraft search and rescue among its roles. The Director General of FRDM reorganises STORM, along with the FRDM Canine Unit and the FRDM Air Division, into rapid deployment forces. They were stationed at Kuantan and Langkawi to quickly deploy to assist with the recovery of a crashed aircraft.

The operational area of the STORM unit was later expanded to include East Malaysia, and they are now stationed at major fire stations in all states.

Structure 
STORM firefighters are assigned to the FRDM's Fire and Rescue Operations Division and are stationed at all major fire stations throughout Malaysia. In an emergency, they can be grouped quickly, depending on the scale of the situation. The FRDM aimed to place at least 30 STORM firefighters in each state.

STORM firefighters are often assisted by search and rescue dogs and their handlers from the FRDM Canine Unit.

Responsibilities 
STORM was originally tasked with USAR, landslide rescue, high-rise rescue and firefighting, and jungle firefighting. Because of the higher concentration of high-rise buildings in West Malaysia at the time, their field of operations was limited to that region. Their roles were later expanded to include various types of operations, such as downed aircraft rescue, surface water rescue, and cave rescue, and they now cover the entire region of Malaysia. Their jobs are similar to those of SMART, but they are overseen by the FRDM and the Ministry of Housing and Local Government.

STORM is responsible for the FRDM's Pusat Kecemerlangan Runtuhan Struktur dan Tanah Runtuh, a training facility for USAR operations. STORM is also in charge of training the MOCSAR, an elite unit composed of auxiliary firefighters specialising in mountain and cave rescue in Sarawak.

When there are no operations that require STORM capabilities, the STORM firefighters serve as ordinary firefighters at the station where they are stationed.

Identities

STORM's shoulder patch 
Every elite unit in FRDM has their own distinctive shoulder patch. The patch symbolised their ability as specialist fire fighters. The STORM's shoulder patch comprises crossed fire axes, a tactical dagger, a figure 8 descent control device, a ribbon with the phrase "Pantas dan Berani" and a lightning bolt.

Red technical rescue USAR helmet 
The red technical rescue  helmets were initially used by the Malaysian SMART team. STORM, as a protégé of SMART in USAR operations, gets training at SMART's headquarters. They later adopt the red helmet as one of their identities. Today, SMART members donned blue technical rescue USAR helmets while STORM and a few FRDM Special Rescue Teams continued to utilize red helmets.

STORM operation's uniform 
Every elite unit in FRDM has a distinctive uniform to make them easily distinguishable during operations. Originally, their outfit simply featured reflective strips. It has subsequently evolved, and currently, there is reflective "STORM" lettering at the back of their outfit.

Selection and training 
The STORM is regarded as the toughest unit in the FRDM. The STORM firefighters are expected to be stronger and more mentally tough than the rest of the regular firefighters. They are trained to operate and survive in a variety of environments, including cities, jungles, swamps, mountains, seas and rivers. They were also exposed to a wide range of sophisticated rescue equipment. STORM's membership was originally limited to veteran firefighters, but it is now open to everyone, including firefighters fresh out of basic training.

STORM selection program (2 days) 
Also known as the Pemilihan Pasukan Special Tactical Operation Rescue Malaysia in Malay, lasts two days at a selected fire station. This programme, for example, is held at Putrajaya for firefighters from Kuala Lumpur, Selangor, Perak, and Putrajaya. Among the tasks that firefighters must perform are:

  run in 45 minutes
 Individual Competency Test
 BEEP test
 BA endurance

STORM Special Course (4 weeks) 
The official name of this course in Malay is Kursus Khas STORM, also known as Kursus Asas Pasukan STORM, and it lasts four weeks. This course is offered at any of Malaysia's five Fire and Rescue Academies (FRAM). Among the Special Rescue Teams in FRDM, this is the longest and most physically and mentally challenging basic course. This course has a high attrition rate. Only 39 out of 423 firefighters passed the STORM Special Course in 2019, accounting for around 7% of those who attempted it. This course is also open to women, and as of 2020, six female firefighters have passed it.

This course has two phases. The first phase is last for two weeks and held mostly in class. All basic skills that firefighters should know are tested and they are introduced with the operation of STORM. In the second phase, candidates need to survive two weeks of physical training. Among of the training that they need to go through during phase 2 including:

 Training for basic survival in the jungle and swamp
 Under 13 minutes for a  run in complete fire kit while carrying extra  weight
  march at high altitude

Candidates who complete all of the assessments at the end of this course will be awarded with a STORM patch during the passing out ceremony.

Advanced training 
Firefighters who have completed the STORM Special Course are already considered STORM members. However, STORM members are required to complete STORM advanced training.

Compulsory STORM advanced trainings 
The advanced training was not done in a row, but rather in phases. The majority of the advanced training listed here is only available to STORM firefighters. Each course is conducted at FRAM and normally has two levels: basic and advanced. Among the training that STORM firefighters must do are the following:

 Rope rescue course (Intermediate level) — 1 week
 Structural Collapse Rescue Course (Intermediate level) — 1 week
 Basic Surface Rescue Swimmer Course — 1 week
 Advanced Surface Rescue Swimmer Course — 1 week
 Jungle and swamp survival (Advance) — 2 weeks
 Wilderness Search and Rescue — 1 week
 Safety and discipline in airborne operations — 1 week
 Coxswain's Course for Small Boats (Basic level) — 1 week

Non-compulsory advanced trainings 
Aside from the mandatory STORM advanced training, STORM firefighters can also enroll in courses offered to all FRDM Special Rescue Teams. Among the courses are the following:

 Basic rescue swimmer (Helicopter) — 1 week
 Advanced rescue swimmer (Helicopter) — 1 week
 Basic tactical helicopter rescue course — 1 week
 Advanced tactical helicopter rescue course — 1 week
 Basic helicopter landing assistant course — 1 week
 Advanced helicopter landing assistant course — 1 week
 Air quartermaster course — 13 weeks

Other courses that are not affiliated with the FRDM Special Rescue Teams are also available to STORM firefighters. Among the courses are the following:

 Diver course
 Venomous animals and snakes handling course (Basic) — 1 week
 Venomous animals and snakes handling course (Advance) — 3 weeks

STORM Refresher Training 
This training, also called Latihan Pengukuhan STORM in Malay, is conducted on a regular basis, especially during storm and flood seasons. This training lasted 5 days, and the STORM firefighters were physically exhausted from the physical exercises before being tested with STORM operations such as high-rise and mountain rescue, urban search and rescue, and landslide rescue. This training was also used to test STORM firefighters' teamwork during times of stress. The STORM Refresher Training is conducted at the state level.

Individual Physical Proficiency Test 
This test is conducted twice a year to ensure that the STORM firefighters are physically fit for any operation. STORM firefighters who are not physically fit are at risk of being removed from the unit.

Future plan

STORM's hazard pay 
In 2018, the government is planning to give an allowance to STORM firefighters due to their harsh work of nature and training. This is comparable to the hazard pay obtained by commando units in Malaysia, known as "Commando allowances", and also to paratroopers in the Malaysian Army, known as "Parachute allowances".

Notable members 

 Abu Zarin Hussin – Senior Fire Officer II Abu Zarin bin Hussin was a world-famous snake-catcher who went viral after being mistaken as a Thai guy who married his pet king cobra. He appeared on Season 2 of Asia's Got Talent. Abu Zarin, the fourth child of a snake-catcher, served as head instructor for venomous animals and snake handling course at Fire and Rescue Academies (FRAM) before going through STORM selection and passing the STORM Special Course in December 2013. Before STORM, he was a member of MUST and the Water Rescue Unit. On 13 March 2018, he was ordered to catch a snake. At that moment, he was off duty, but as a firefighter that was accountable for handling snakes, he went to operations while accompanied by his wife. He got bitten on the hand by a king cobra that bit through the sack that he was holding. He was promptly sent to the nearest hospital. He died on 16 March 2018, 3 days after falling into a coma. He was posthumously promoted to the rank of Senior Fire Officer II on 2 April 2018. He was a founder of Skuad King Cobra JBPM, a specialist firefighting unit that was assigned to catch deadly snakes. They are also tasked with teaching firefighters, government organizations, and civilians how to handle snakes.
 Safiq Mohamad – Fire Officer Safiq bin Mohamad is a YouTuber, a STORM firefighter, and also a snake handling instructor. He was one of the first batch of students of Abu Zarin Hussin and he is famed for his snake handling skills. He is also a member of Skuad King Cobra JBPM and his actions as a snake-catcher are shown on the squad's official YouTube channel (Link). He is currently employed at FRAM as the chief instructor of the venomous animals and snakes handling course.
 Shafiq Mohamad – Fire Officer Shafiq Mohamad is a social media influencer and a STORM firefighter. He is known online as "Apit SW". He regularly shares his activities and training as a STORM firefighter on his social media networks, apit.sw and APIT SW CHANNEL.
 Syahidi Hamidun – Senior Fire Officer I Syahidi Hamidun is a YouTuber and a STORM firefighter. Before joining STORM, he was a member of FRDM Smokejumper. On his YouTube channel, S.H. Channel, he always shared his STORM's operations, other FRDM's units, and his interests. One of his videos was shown on TV1's Selamat Pagi Malaysia program, which was about saving trapped people from a collapsed condo building site in Taman Desa in February 2020.

In popular culture 

 2015: "", a romantic novel by Mia Kiff, is about a teenage girl falling in love with her saviour, a firefighter. The main male character, Rayqal, is represented as a STORM and Water Rescue Unit firefighter. 
The series is aired on the Astro Ria channel.

Notes

References 

Fire service special operations
Cave rescue organizations
Mountain rescue agencies